Hiten Mehra (born 18 December 1997) is an Indian cricketer. He made his Twenty20 debut for Gujarat in the 2016–17 Inter State Twenty-20 Tournament on 4 February 2017.

References

External links
 

1997 births
Living people
Indian cricketers
Gujarat cricketers
Cricketers from Gujarat